John McClung may refer to:
 John McClung (judge), Canadian historian, lawyer and judge
 John Alexander McClung (1891–1942), American singer-songwriter
 John McClung (1906–1991), guitar player  with John & Emery McClung, old-time music performers